Roman Romanovych Mykhayliv (born 31 January 2003) is a Ukrainian professional footballer who plays as a midfielder for Lviv, on loan from Dynamo Kyiv.

Career
Born in Lviv, Mykhayliv is a product of the local Karpaty Lviv and Lviv youth academy systems.

In October 2020, he transferred to Dynamo Kyiv. Almost one year later, in September 2021 he returned to Lviv on loan for the 2021–22 Ukrainian Premier League season. He made his professional debut as a second-half substitute on 20 November against Zorya Luhansk.

References

External links 

2003 births
Living people
Sportspeople from Lviv
Ukrainian footballers
Association football midfielders
FC Dynamo Kyiv players
FC Lviv players
Ukrainian Premier League players